Rasmus is a shortened form of "Erasmus", a name which means "beloved" and was the name of Erasmus of Formia, a well-known saint. It is a common male name in Scandinavia.

People with the given name Rasmus include:

Rasmus B. Anderson (1846–1936), American author, professor, and diplomat
Rasmus Andersson, Swedish ice hockey player for the Calgary Flames
Rasmus Bille Bahncke, Danish songwriter, record producer and musician
Rasmus Bartholin (1625-1698) (Latinized Erasmus Bartholinus), Danish scientist and physician
Rasmus Bengtsson, Swedish football player
Rasmus Bengtsson (ice hockey), Swedish ice hockey player
Rasmus Bjerg, Danish actor
Rasmus Boysen (born 1992), Danish handball player
Rasmus Christensen, (born 1991), Danish football player
Rasmus Christiansen (actor), Danish actor
Rasmus Dahlin, Swedish ice hockey player for the Buffalo Sabres
Rasmus Daugaard, Danish football player
Rasmus Edstrom, Swedish ice hockey player
Rasmus Elm, Swedish football player
Rasmus Faber, Swedish music artist
Rasmus Fleischer, Swedish historian, musician, freelance journalist
Rasmus Hansen (footballer born 1979), Danish football player
Rasmus Hansen (gymnast) (1885–1967), Danish gymnast
Rasmus Hansen (politician) (1797–1860s), Norwegian jurist and politician
Rasmus Hardiker, English actor
Rasmus Grønborg Hansen, Danish football player
Rasmus Quist Hansen, Danish rower
Rasmus Harboe (1868–1952), Danish sculptor
Rasmus Henning, Danish triathlon athlete
Rasmus Falk, Danish footballer
Rasmus Festersen, Danish football player
Rasmus Flo (1851–1905), Norwegian teacher, philologist, magazine editor, translator and proponent for Nynorsk language
Rasmus Frandsen (1886–1974), Danish rower
Rasmus Green (1980–2006), Danish football player
Rasmus Hatledal (1885–1963), Norwegian topographer and military officer.
Rasmus Jensen (priest) (d. 1620), Danish Lutheran priest and the first Lutheran cleric in Canada
Rasmus Jensen (speedway rider) (born 1993), Danish motorcycle rider
Rasmus Jönsson, Swedish football player
Rasmus Kaljujärv, Estonian actor
Rasmus Katholm, Danish football player
Rasmus Kofoed, Danish chef and restaurateur
Rasmus Kofoed (cricketer), Danish cricketer
Rasmus Kupari, Finish hockey player
Rasmus Olsen Langeland (1873-1954), Norwegian politician and minister
Rasmus Lerdorf, Greenlandic-Danish programmer and creator of the PHP programming language
Rasmus Lindgren, Swedish football player
Rasmus Løland (1861–1907), Norwegian journalist, novelist and children's writer
Rasmus Lyberth, Greenlandic singer, songwriter and actor
Rasmus Malling-Hansen (1835–1890), Danish inventor, minister and principal at the Royal Institute for the Deaf, and one of the true pioneers of the 19th century
Rasmus Marvits, Danish football player
Rasmus Midgett, (1851–1926), US Life-Saving Service surfman in North Carolina who single-handedly rescued ten men from the sinking barkentine Priscilla
Rasmus Olai Mortensen (1869-1934), Norwegian politician and minister
Rasmus Nielsen (disambiguation)
Rasmus Tønder Nissen (1822–1882), Norwegian politician
Rasmus Nøhr, Danish musician and guitarist
Rasmus Nordbø (1915 – 1983), Norwegian administrator and minister
Rasmus Peetson (born 1995), Estonian footballer
Rasmus Pettersen, Norwegian gymnast
Rasmus Quaade, Danish road and track bicycle racer
Rasmus Rändvee (born 1995), Estonian singer
Rasmus Christian Rask (1787-1832), Danish scholar and philologist
Rasmus Rasmussen (disambiguation), several people
Rasmus Ristolainen, Finnish ice hockey player for the Philadelphia Flyers
Rasmus Sandin, Swedish ice hockey player for the Toronto Maple Leafs
Rasmus Lauge Schmidt, Danish handball player
Rasmus Schüller (born 1991), Finnish football player 
Rasmus Seebach, Danish singer songwriter
Rasmus Sindre, (1859-1908), Norwegian newspaper editor and politician
Rasmus Sjöstedt, Swedish football player
Rasmus Skylstad (1893–1972), Norwegian diplomat
Rasmus Carl Staeger (18001875), Danish entomologist
Rasmus Steinsvik (1863–1913), Norwegian writer, magazine editor and newspaper editor
Rasmus Stjerne, Danish curler
Rasmus Thude, Danish singer and songwriter
Rasmus Andreas Torset (1897-1965), Norwegian politician
Rasmus Videbæk, Danish cinematographer
Rasmus Wengberg, Swedish badminton player
Rasmus Borregaard Winther, Danish League of Legends e-sport player
Rasmus Wremer, Swedish handball player
Rasmus Würtz, Danish football player

References

See also
Rasmus (disambiguation)

Scandinavian masculine given names
Danish masculine given names
Estonian masculine given names
Norwegian masculine given names
Swedish masculine given names